Clear Lake is a small lake just west-northwest of Blue Lake at Cape Royds, Ross Island. A descriptive name given by the British Antarctic Expedition (1907-09). It is the deepest lake in this vicinity.

References

Lakes of Antarctica